Quincy – Here We Come is an album led by trumpeter Benny Bailey, trombonist Åke Persson and drummer Joe Harris featuring performances recorded in Sweden in 1959 and originally released on the Swedish Metronome label. The album was released in the US in 1960 as The Music of Quincy Jones on Argo Records. The album is one of the earliest devoted solely to the compositions of Quincy Jones and emerged from his work in Europe in the late 1950s.

Reception

Allmusic awarded the album 3 stars.

Track listing
All compositions by Quincy Jones
 "The Golden Touch" (Jones, Oscar Pettiford) - 5:01
 "Jones Beach" - 4:52
 "The Midnight Sun Never Sets" (Jones, Dorcas Cochran, Henri Salvador) - 4:55
 "I'm Gone" (Jones, King Pleasure) - 5:15
 "Meet Benny Bailey" - 2:48
 "Count 'Em" (Jones, Jimmy Cleveland) - 7:33
 "Fallen Feathers" - 3:30
 "Plenty, Plenty Soul" (Jones, Milt Jackson) - 3:32

Personnel
Benny Bailey - trumpet (tracks 1, 2, 4, 5 & 7) 
Åke Persson - trombone  (tracks 1, 3, 4-6 & 8) 
Arne Domnérus - alto saxophone (tracks 2, 4 & 5)
Bjarne Nerem - tenor saxophone (tracks 4-6) 
Gunnar Svensson (track 1), Gösta Theselius (tracks 3-6) - piano 
Lennart Jansson (tracks 1, 4, 5 & 8)  - baritone saxophone
Gunnar Johnson - bass
Anders Burman (tracks 3 & 6), Joe Harris (tracks 1, 2, 4, 5, 7 & 8) - drums

References

1960 albums
Argo Records albums
Benny Bailey albums